Edgar Brooke (19 December 1862 – 3 May 1938) was a New Zealand cricketer. He played in two first-class matches for Wellington in 1889/90.

See also
 List of Wellington representative cricketers

References

External links
 

1862 births
1938 deaths
New Zealand cricketers
Wellington cricketers